Beck Institute for Cognitive Behavior Therapy, a non-profit organization located in suburban Philadelphia, is an international cognitive behavior therapy (CBT) training and research center. It was founded in 1994 by Aaron T. Beck and his daughter Judith S. Beck.

Aaron T. Beck was the Beck Institute's President Emeritus. Beck died on November 1, 2021 at age 100.  He is recognized as the founder of cognitive therapy, one of the elements from which cognitive behavior therapy developed. His daughter, Judith Beck, is Beck Institute's current President. Aaron Beck was University Professor Emeritus of Psychiatry at the time of his death University of Pennsylvania and had continued doing research there, while Judith Beck is a Clinical Professor of Psychology in Psychiatry at the same university. Lisa Pote is Beck Institute's Executive Director, and Allen R. Miller is CBT Program Director.

Among Beck Institute's training programs are Philadelphia Workshops held at the Beck Institute, On the Road Workshops held throughout the US, the Beck Institute Supervision program, and Training for Organizations in which Beck faculty travel around the world to teach. Beck Institute's workshops cover a variety of topics, including CBT for Depression, Anxiety, Personality Disorders, Youth, PTSD, Schizophrenia, and more. Beck Institute offers scholarships for therapists working with active duty military and veterans through their Soldier Suicide Prevention initiative and holds an annual scholarship competition for graduate students and faculty.

Beck Institute also runs a clinic at its location in suburban Philadelphia.

References

External links
 

Cognitive behavioral therapy
Organizations based in Philadelphia
Organizations established in 1994
Non-profit organizations based in Pennsylvania
1994 establishments in Pennsylvania